Niala may refer to:

Niala, Benin
Niala, Iran
Niala, Mali
Tropical Storm Niala

See also 
 Nyala (disambiguation)